The Party of the Democratic Left (SDĽ) is a centre-left political party in Slovakia.  It is the reformation of another party by the same name, which had been founded in 1990.

The original Party of the Democratic Left merged with Robert Fico's Direction – Social Democracy, which had itself split from the Party of the Democratic Left, on 31 December 2004.  A new party was founded, and registered in May 2005.  The party's current president is Jozef Ďurica.

In its first general election, in 2006, the party won 0.13% of the vote. In 2010 elections, the SDĽ won 2.41%, falling just under half of the 5% threshold for seats in the National Council.

See also
 Politics of Slovakia
 List of political parties in Slovakia

External links
Official page (Slovak)

Political parties established in 2005
Social democratic parties in Slovakia